Cuprate loosely refers to a material that can be viewed as containing anionic copper complexes.  Examples include tetrachloridocuprate ([CuCl4]2−), the superconductor YBa2Cu3O7, and the organocuprates (e.g., dimethylcuprate [Cu(CH3)2]−). The term cuprates derives from the Latin word for copper, cuprum.  The term is mainly used in three contexts: oxide materials, anionic coordination complexes, and anionic organocopper compounds.

Oxides
One of the simplest oxide-based cuprates is the copper(III) oxide KCuO2, also known as "potassium cuprate(III)".  This species can be viewed as the K+ salt of the polyanion []n.  As such the material is classified as a cuprate.  This dark blue diamagnetic solid is produced by heating potassium peroxide and copper(II) oxide in an atmosphere of oxygen:
K2O2 + 2 CuO → 2 KCuO2

Other cuprates(III) of alkali metals are known; in additional, structure of KCuO2, RbCuO2 and CsCuO2 has been determined as well.

KCuO2 was discovered first in 1952 by V. K. Wahl and W. Klemm, they synthesized this compound by heating copper(II) oxide and potassium superoxide in an atmosphere of oxygen.
2KO2 + 2CuO → KCuO2 + O2

It can also be synthesized by heating potassium superoxide and copper powder: 

KO2 + Cu → KCuO2

KCuO2 reacts with the air fairly slowly. It starts to decompose at 760K and its color changes from blue to pale green at 975K. Its melting point is 1025K. 

RbCuO2 (blue-black) and CsCuO2 (black) can be prepared by reaction of rubidium oxide and caesium oxide with copper(II) oxide powders, at 675K and 655K in oxygen atmosphere, respectively. Either of them reacts with the air fast, unlike KCuO2. 

In fact, KCuO2 is a non-stoichiometric compound, so the more exact formula is KCuOx and x is very close to 2. This causes the formation of defects in the crystal structure, and this leads to the tendency of this compound to be reduced. 

Sodium cuprate(III) NaCuO2 can be produced by using hypochlorites or hypobromites to oxidize copper hydroxide under alkaline and low temperature conditions.

2NaOH + CuSO4 → Cu(OH)2 ↓
Cu(OH)2 + 2NaOH + NaClO → 2NaCuO2 + NaCl + 

Cuprates(III) are not stable in water, and they can oxidize water as well. 

4 + 2 → 4CuO +  ↑ + 4

Sodium cuprate(III) has reddish-brown color and turn black gradually because they decompose into copper(II) oxide. In order to prevent them from decomposing, they must be produced at low temperature and without light.

Coordination complexes
Copper forms many anionic coordination complexes with negatively charged ligands such as cyanide, hydroxide, halides, as well as alkyls and aryls.

Copper(I)
Cuprates containing copper(I) tend to be colorless, reflecting their d10 configuration. Structures range from linear 2-coordinate, trigonal planar, and tetrahedral.  Examples include dichloro and trichlorocuprates, i.e., linear [CuCl2]− and trigonal planar [CuCl3]2−. Cyanide gives analogous complexes but also the trianionic tetracyanocuprate(I), [Cu(CN)4]3−. Dicyanocuprate(I) exists in both molecular or polymeric motifs, depending on the countercation.

Copper(II)

The chlorocuprates include trichlorocuprate(II) [CuCl3]−, which is dimeric, square-planar tetrachlorocuprate(II) [CuCl4]2−, and pentachlorocuprate(II) [CuCl5]3−.  3-Coordinate chlorocuprate(II) complexes are rare.

Tetrachlorocuprate(II) complexes tend to adopt flattened tetrahedral geometry with orange colors.

Sodium tetrahydroxycuprate (Na2[Cu(OH)4]) is an example of a homoleptic (all ligands being the same) hydroxide complex.
Cu(OH)2 + 2 NaOH → Na2Cu(OH)4

Copper(III) and copper(IV)
Hexafluorocuprate(III) [CuF6]3− and hexafluorocuprate(IV) [CuF6]2− are rare examples of copper(III) and copper(IV) complexes.  They are strong oxidizing agents.

Organic cuprates

Cuprates have a role in organic synthesis. They are invariably Cu(I), although Cu(II) or even Cu(III) intermediates are invoked in some mechanisms. Organic cuprates often have the idealized formulas [CuR2]− and [CuR3]2−, where R is an alkyl or aryl.  These reagents find use as nucleophilic alkylating reagents.

See also
Cuprate superconductor
High-temperature superconductivity
Gilman reagent

References

Copper compounds
Anions
Oxometallates
Transition metal oxyanions